WorldEdit is an editing tool for the 2011 Mojang sandbox video game Minecraft, developed by software group EngineHub. It was released worldwide on 28 September 2010 as a plugin for the hMod modification. It has since been ported as a Bukkit plugin and as a mod for the Fabric and Forge mod loaders. With almost 26 million downloads from Curseforge as of February 2022, it is the most popular Bukkit plugin of all time, and is also one of the most popular Fabric/Forge mods available. Having been released just over a month after Minecraft's multiplayer update, WorldEdit is also one of the oldest server-side plugins. The WorldEdit project, initially started by sk89q, is currently run by Me4502.

WorldEdit has been featured on the Minecraft website as one of the most popular building tools. WorldEdit has also been cited in United States patents and scientific papers. Many professional Minecraft builders and artists utilize WorldEdit in their projects.

WorldEdit's primary feature is to assist the player in building structures, a core gameplay mechanic of Minecraft, and in creating customized terrain. WorldEdit can be used to build almost anything through a variety of tools such as brushes, block replacers, and more.

As of September 2019, WorldEdit can be used externally to Minecraft as standalone software. This has spawned non-Minecraft projects such as WorldEdit Golf, which is a challenge to perform a task with as few commands as possible.

See also
Minecraft mod
Minecraft server

References

External links

Video game mods
Minecraft